A flattop is a type of very short hairstyle.

Flat top, Flattop, or Flat Top may also refer to:

Places
 Flat Top (Ross Dependency), the tallest peak in the Commonwealth Range in Antarctica, rising to 
 Flat Top (Coats Land), table mountain in Coats Land, Antarctica
 Flat Top (Georgia), a mountain in Rabun County, Georgia, U.S.
 Flat Top, Jefferson County, Alabama
 Flat Top, Virginia
 Flat Top, West Virginia, an unincorporated community in Mercer County, West Virginia, United States
 Flat Top Island, Tasmania
 Flat Top Island, Queensland
 Flat Top Manor, manor near Blowing Rock, North Carolina
 Flattop Island, in the San Juan Islands of the U.S. state of Washington.
 Flattop Island (Nunavut), Canada 
 Flattop Mountain, name shared by many mountains and buttes in the United States

Other uses
 Flat Top (film), a 1952 film starring Sterling Hayden as an aircraft carrier commander
 Flat Top (song), a song by the Goo Goo Dolls
 Flat-Top (comics), a fictional character published by Harvey Comics
 Flat top guitar, a type of guitar body model
 Flattop (Dick Tracy villain), full name Flattop Jones
 Flattop (Transformers), a member of the Micromasters
 Flattop, another name for an aircraft carrier
 Flattop grill, a cooking appliance
 A name for a jointer woodworking tool
 Flattop (critical assembly), an experiment at Los Alamos National Laboratory
 A term used for table mountains or mesas
 A term used to describe vintage cars rooftop lines (e.g. Cadillac de Ville series)